The legislative districts of Capiz are the representation of the province of Capiz in the various national legislatures of the Philippines. The province is currently represented in the lower house of the Congress of the Philippines through its first and second congressional districts.

History 
Capiz initially comprised a single district to the Malolos Congress from 1898 to 1899. It was later divided into three legislative districts from 1907 to 1957, when Aklan was granted its own representation, reducing it to two legislative districts. Romblon was also represented as part of the third district from 1907 to 1919.

In the disruption caused by the Second World War, two delegates represented the province in the National Assembly of the Japanese-sponsored Second Philippine Republic: one was the provincial governor (an ex officio member), while the other was elected through a provincial assembly of KALIBAPI members during the Japanese occupation of the Philippines. Upon the restoration of the Philippine Commonwealth in 1945, the province continued to comprise three districts.

Capiz was part of the representation of Region VI from 1978 to 1984, and from 1984 to 1986 it elected two assemblymen at-large.

Current districts and representatives 
Political parties

Defunct districts

3rd District 

Municipalities: Buruanga, Ibajay, Kalibo, Libacao, Makato (Taft), Malinao, Nabas, Numancia (Lezo), Lezo (re-established 1941), Tangalan (re-established 1948), Madalag (re-established 1948), Malay (established 1949)

Notes

1907–1909 
Municipalities: Badajoz, Buruanga, Cajidiocan, Calivo, Ibajay, Libacao, Looc, Malinao, Nabas, Odiongan, Romblon, San Fernando, Taft

1909–1919 
Municipalities: Badajoz, Buruanga, Cajidiocan, Ibajay, Looc, Malinao, Nabas, Odiongan, Romblon, San Fernando, Taft, Jones (re-established 1918)

At-large district

1898–1899

1943-1944

1984-1986

See also 
Legislative districts of Aklan
Legislative district of Romblon

References 

Capiz
Politics of Capiz